Edgar Claxton MBE, FICE, FIEE, FIMechE (7 July 1910 – 13 August 2000) was a British rail engineer. He worked for the British Railways Board and was part of the team which electrified parts of the United Kingdom's mainline railway network in the 1960s. He was responsible for "design and procurement of all the equipment, and for the electrification side of the projects." He was made an MBE in 1969 for his work.

Background and private life
Edgar Claxton's parents were Edgar "Ted" Claxton (Marylebone 10 June 1883 – Hillingdon 5 February 1971), and Nellie Mildred "Helen" Petty (Hackney 20 August 1883 – Uxbridge 21 February 1945). They married on 1 August 1908, in Hammersmith. Ted was a poor law settlement officer, working around the country from the offices of St Marylebone Workhouse. At the same time he was registrar for births and deaths for Marylebone parish, working from an office in his home, as did his father Jesse. Helen was a music teacher, and the honorary piano accompanist for the Northwood Choral Society. A year after Helen's death, Ted Claxton married Mary Browning Eustance (1887–1966) in Edmonton on 24 April 1946.

Edgar Claxton was born in Marylebone  on 7 July 1910, and died in Oxford on 13 August 2000. He first appeared in the newspapers at the age of two years, having attended a family wedding. He attended Merchant Taylors' School, Northwood, and in 1939 he gained First Class Honours in engineering at University College London. On 11 July 1928, soon after Claxton's 18th birthday, a motor car driven by Edgar Claxton of Roy Road, Northwood, who had "driven for a year, and previously driven a motor cycle", was involved in a collision with a motor cycle in Northwood. The pillion rider of the motorcycle, 19-year-old Beatrice Davis, died. At the inquest of 20 July 1928 it was found that the car had stopped before the impact, the motor cyclist had been driving too fast, and that Edgar Claxton was "exonerated from all blame." The verdict was "accidental death."

Between 1952 and 1975 Claxton was living at 47 Grange Gardens, Pinner. He married Elizabeth "Betty" Welsh (1910–1986). They had several children. In 1996 he was the sponsor and main benefactor to St Laurence Church, Shotteswell, Warwickshire, when the six bells of the church were matched, re-tuned and re-hung, following long disuse. He is buried in Shotteswell churchyard.

Career

Early career
Claxton's first employment was with the engineering firm Kennedy & Donkin. This involved him with projects "mostly for generating and sub-stations, overhead lines and cables," including work in Northern Ireland and "construction of the National Grid in Scotland." In 1937 Claxton became a technical assistant, appointed by Sir Nigel Gresley to the London North Eastern Railway (LNER). This appointment involved "dealing with power supply and 33kV distribution systems and associated equipment for the impending Manchester–Sheffield and Liverpool Street–Sheffield electrical systems, and other works." In 1939 he was living in lodgings with other LNER staff at 11 North Road, Glossop, describing himself as a civil and electrical engineer, LNER traction staff.

World War II
As an essential railway worker he did not do military service in World War II. Instead, he worked for the Admiralty Dockyard Department.  Here, he "looked after planning, specifications and contracts for electrical distribution systems for dock works both at home and abroad."

Later career
After the war, Claxton was again employed by LNER as senior technical assistant in the Electric Traction Section, "handling contracts for electric locomotives and rolling stock," developing diesel and electric shunting locomotives. He was involved in running trials in Zeist, Utrecht, for some years, with respect to Gresley's prototype electrical locomotive Tommy, LNER no.6701.

By the end of 1951, Claxton was the assistant electrification engineer for the MSW electrification scheme, based at Dukinfield, "supervising all branches of the MSW electrification project from end to end," including Scotland. He was working with Metropolitan Vickers & Co., "installing electrical equipment into the newly formed fleet of locomotives for the re-started 1936 programme," i.e. the project plans in which he had been involved before the war. From 1952, Claxton was the assistant electrical engineer (development), for the chief electrical engineer's department, British Railways central staff, British Transport Commission (BTC). Following pioneer electrification of the Aix-les-Bains to La Roche-sur-Foron line, and the Valenciennes to Thionville line in 1954, the BTC asked Edgar Claxton to chair a "committee to review electrification strategy for main lines."

He read a paper at the British Railways Electrification Conference in 1960. He "was part of the team setting up the first overhead wires for electrification of the mainline railway and was involved in the project commemorated" in the British Railways booklet, Change at Crewe (1960). This brochure details "the completion of Stage One, Manchester-Crewe of the Manchester-Liverpool-Euston Electrification Scheme."

By 1969, Claxton was the fixed equipment projects engineer for the British Railways Board. He was "involved in all British Railway electrification projects throughout the country, and [was] responsible for the design and procurement of all the equipment, and for the electrification side of the projects." E.M. Johnson (2018) says: By the time of his retirement in 1975, Claxton had attained a post with the British Railways Board of Mechanical and Electrical Engineering (Electrification). Working with BR(LMR) he was therefore at the forefront of the biggest electrification schemes, both main line and suburban, of the 1950s and 1960s – notably the Manchester–Crewe and West Coast–Crewe to Euston and Crewe to Glasgow projects as well as such precursors as the Lancaster–Morecambe–Heysham ac experiments and those on the Colchester–Clacton–Walton and the Styal lines.

Retirement work
Following his 1975 retirement, Claxton became a Transmark consultant. He was "heavily involved" in the electrification aspect of the design of the Channel Tunnel (with which he had had links since the 1950s) and in the railway electrification systems of Brazil, Romania and Finland.

Awards and institutions
In 1946 when Claxton was living in Bath, he was elected an Associate of the Institution of Mechanical Engineers, and later became a FIMechE. He was a Fellow of the Institution of Civil Engineers (FICE), and a Fellow of the Institution of Electrical Engineers (FIEE). For his work he was made MBE in the 1969 Birthday Honours of Elizabeth II.

Claxton's team's overhead lines in 1960

According to Claxton's Overhead Line Equipment paper of 1960, the lines included in the electrification plan were: Manchester–Crewe; Liverpool–Crewe; Crewe-Euston; Colchester–Clacton–Walton; Liverpool Street–Chelmsford–Southend; Liverpool Street–Enfield–Chingford–Hertford–Bishop's Stortford; London–Tilbury–Southend; Glasgow Suburban Stage I; Chelmsford–Colchester.

Claxton and his team faced and resolved a number of challenges to the installation of the overhead electrification system. Overhead lines were considered less dangerous and more convenient than an electrified third rail which could not be used on level crossings and in the rail yards. There was often little room between the train roofs and the bridges, bridges could not always be raised, and lowering the track level below bridges was not always feasible. The damp British atmosphere threatened to facilitate corrosion in electrical installations, while maintenance costs had to be limited.

Where tunnels could not be adapted for space, lower-voltage equipment was fitted in. "Welded-and-braced portal structures and extensive trials with tubular structures" formed part of the solution for carrying the equipment. They spent a lot on compound structures, non-ferrous fittings and special insulators to protect equipment from weathering and air pollution, making it safe for fast trains. Where there had to be neutral sections and gaps in electrification, special equipment was designed for the transition between differing power supplies. Regarding this challenge, Claxton said in 1960, "Section insulators of high performance have been provided and advanced high-speed bi-directional designs have now been developed." At that stage in 1960, the team was investigating "less expensive galvanised live-side fittings, simple high-speed sectioning devices and the use of glass-fibre and toughened glass." They were aiming to save construction and maintenance costs, and simplify the design, while making sure that the equipment would work properly and last well.

In October 1960, Ernest Marples said, "It will be the technical advances that will decide the attraction of rail travel in the future. There is the news of the Manchester-Crewe electrification. There is the news of the Kent electrification, which has brought about a 36 per cent. increase in passengers over the previous steam traction."

See also
 Railway electrification in Great Britain

Notes

References

External links

British Rail people
1910 births
2000 deaths
20th-century British engineers
British railway civil engineers
English civil engineers
English electrical engineers
English railway mechanical engineers
Members of the Order of the British Empire
People from Marylebone
Fellows of the Institution of Mechanical Engineers
Alumni of University College London
People educated at Merchant Taylors' School, Northwood